is a railway station in the city of  Shinshiro, Aichi Prefecture, Japan, operated by Central Japan Railway Company (JR Tōkai).

Lines
Chausuyama Station is served by the Iida Line, and is located 23.8 kilometers from the starting point of the line at Toyohashi Station.

Station layout
The station has a single side platform serving one bidirectional track.The station building has automated ticket machines, TOICA automated turnstiles and is unattended.

Adjacent stations

|-
!colspan=5|Central Japan Railway Company

Station history
Chausuyama Station was established on May 1, 1926 as a station on the now-defunct . On August 1, 1943, t the Toyokawa Railway were nationalized along with some other local lines to form the Japanese Government Railways (JGR) Iida Line.  Scheduled freight operations were discontinued in 1962. The station has been unattended since 1971. Along with its division and privatization of JNR on April 1, 1987, the station came under the control and operation of the Central Japan Railway Company (JR Tōkai). A new station building was completed in February 1996.

Surrounding area
Japan National Route 151

See also
 List of Railway Stations in Japan

References

External links

Railway stations in Japan opened in 1926
Railway stations in Aichi Prefecture
Iida Line
Stations of Central Japan Railway Company
Shinshiro, Aichi